The New Birth Brass Band was formed by the trumpeter and vocalist James Andrews.  The intent was a renewal of New Orleans brass band tradition. As Andrews said, "The old cats used to play a lot of sacred dirges and church hymns and traditional standards, and we just got a new spin with our own music and a new beat."

The band's first album, D-Boy, produced by Allen Toussaint, was released on February 25, 1997.

References

American brass bands